Anatoly Petrovych Tkachuk (15 February 1937 – 17 September 2017) was a Ukrainian rower who had his best achievements in the coxed fours, partnering with Vladimir Yevseyev, Vitaly Kurdchenko, Boris Kuzmin and Anatoly Luzgin. In this event, they won two European titles and a silver medal at the 1966 World Rowing Championships; they finished in fifth place at the 1964 Summer Olympics. 
At the 1972 Summer Olympics, Kurdchenko rowed with a coxless four team of Igor Kashurov, Aleksandr Motin and Vitaly Sapronov and finished in fourth place. He also competed in the coxed eights and won a European silver in 1969.

References

External links
 
 
 

1937 births
2017 deaths
Olympic rowers of the Soviet Union
Rowers at the 1964 Summer Olympics
Rowers at the 1972 Summer Olympics
Soviet male rowers
Ukrainian male rowers
World Rowing Championships medalists for the Soviet Union
European Rowing Championships medalists
People from Kamianske
Sportspeople from Dnipropetrovsk Oblast